"First Winter" (Korean: 첫 겨울이니까; cheos gyeoul-inikka) is a duet recorded by South Korean singers Sung Si-kyung and IU. It was released as a digital single on December 9, 2019 by SK Jaewon Co. and Kakao M.

Background
On December 5, Sung Si-kyung’s agency stated, “Sung Si Kyung’s new digital single, which is set for release on December 9, will feature IU.” The digital single titled “First Winter”. Sung Si Kyung and IU worked together in 2010 on the song “It’s You,” making this their first collaboration in over nine years.

Track listing

Chart performance
The song debuted at number 3 on South Korea's Gaon Digital Chart for the chart issue dated December 8–14, 2019

Charts

Accolades

References 

2019 songs
2019 singles
Korean-language songs
IU (singer) songs
Sung Si-kyung songs